is a Japanese child actress from Saitama Prefecture, Japan. She is a part of the Himawari Theatre Group.

Filmography

Movies
  (2008)
  (2008)
  (2009)
  (2009)
  (2010)
  (2010)
  (2010)
  (2016)

TV dramas
  (2008)
  (2009)
  (2009)
  (2010)

Television commercials
Dupont Japan
Benesse
Karaoke BanBan
Yamato Transport

Video games
Resident Evil 2 (2019) (Sherry Birkin)

Dubbing

Live-action
Annie (Annie Bennett (Quvenzhané Wallis))
Suicide Squad (Zoe (Shailyn Pierre-Dixon))
Teenage Mutant Ninja Turtles (Young April O'Neil (Malina Weissman))
Wonder Woman (12-year-old Diana (Emily Carey))

Animation
Arthur Christmas (Gwen Hines)

Other
Shōhin Korin (TV Tokyo)

References

External links
Himawari Theatre Group website
Introduction by Yahoo!人物名鑑(People Directory)

2002 births
Living people
Japanese child actresses
Japanese film actresses
Japanese television actresses
Japanese voice actresses
Actors from Saitama Prefecture
21st-century Japanese actresses